This article lists successful revolutions and coups d'état that have taken place in the history of Haiti:

18th century 
 1791 onward: Emergence of the State of Haiti; independence proclaimed in 1804 as a consequence of the Haitian Revolution and the disestablishment of the French colony of Saint-Domingue.

19th century 
 8 October 1820: Suicide of King Henri Christophe.
 13 February 1843: Deposition of President for life Jean-Pierre Boyer.
 15 January 1859: Deposition of Emperor Faustin Soulouque.
 15 April 1876: Deposition of President Michel Domingue.
 10 August 1888: Deposition of President Lysius Salomon.

20th century 
 2 December 1908: Deposition of President for life Pierre Nord Alexis.
 28 July 1915: Deposition and murder of President Vilbrun Guillaume Sam, triggering the U.S. occupation.
 11 January 1946: Deposition of president Élie Lescot (Revolution of 1946)
 7 February 1986: Deposition of President for life Jean-Claude Duvalier (climax of the Anti-Duvalier protest movement).
 20 June 1988: Deposition of President Leslie Manigat (June 1988 coup d'état).
 18 September 1988: Deposition of President Henri Namphy (September 1988 coup d'état).
 29 September 1991: First deposition of President Jean-Bertrand Aristide (1991 coup d'état).

21st century 
 5–29 February 2004: Second deposition of President Jean-Bertrand Aristide (2004 coup d'état).

See also 
 List of coups d'état and coup attempts
 List of coups d'état and coup attempts by country
 Assassination of Jovenel Moïse

References 

18th century in Haiti
19th century in Haiti
20th century in Haiti
21st century in Haiti

Haiti politics-related lists
Government of Haiti
Political history of Haiti
Lists of military conflicts
Politics of Haiti
Revolutions and coups d'etat
Haiti
Revolutions